Cosmia is a genus of moths of the family Noctuidae.

Species
 Cosmia achatina Butler, 1879
 Cosmia affinis – lesser-spotted pinion (Linnaeus, 1767)
 Cosmia angulifera Boursin, 1957
 Cosmia calami (Harvey, 1876)
 Cosmia camptostigma (Ménétriés, 1859)
 Cosmia cara (Butler, 1881)
 Cosmia confinis Herrich-Schäffer, [1849]
 Cosmia diffinis (Linnaeus, 1767)
 Cosmia elisae Lafontaine & Troubridge, 2003
 Cosmia epipaschia (Grote, 1883)
 Cosmia flavifimbria (Hampson, 1910)
 Cosmia foveata (Pagenstecher, 1888)
 Cosmia hangrongtzuooi Ronkay & Ronkay, 1999
 Cosmia inconspicua (Draudt, 1950)
 Cosmia ledereri (Staudinger, 1897)
 Cosmia limacodina Sugi, 1997
 Cosmia mali Sugi, 1982
 Cosmia moderata (Staudinger, 1888)
 Cosmia monotona (Hampson, 1914)
 Cosmia natalensis (Prout, 1925)
 Cosmia ochreimargo (Hampson, 1894)
 Cosmia olivescens (Hampson, 1910)
 Cosmia poecila Hreblay & Ronkay, 1997
 Cosmia polymorpha Pinhey, 1968
 Cosmia praeacuta (Smith, 1894) (syn: Cosmia parvimacula Smith, 1903)
 Cosmia pyralina – lunar-spotted pinion (Denis & Schiffermüller, 1775)
 Cosmia restituta Walker, [1857]
 Cosmia sanguinea Sugi, 1955
 Cosmia spurcopyga (Alphéraky, 1895)
 Cosmia subtilis Staudinger, 1888
 Cosmia trapezina – dun-bar (Linnaeus, 1758)
 Cosmia trilineata (Motschulsky, 1860)
 Cosmia unicolor (Staudinger, 1892)

References
 Cosmia at Markku Savela's Lepidoptera and Some Other Life Forms
 Natural History Museum Lepidoptera genus database

 
Hadeninae